Loutrochori(on) meaning "bath town"; formerly Paina, Πάινα and Bania, Μπάνια meaning "baths") is a village in the Pella regional unit, of Macedonia in Greece. According to the 2011 census, it has a population of 458, its area is 7.506 km2, and its population density is 62.08 per km2. The village is on a hill and thus it has a view of the surrounding countryside.

The Loutrochori area was famous from ancient times for its spa.

History

Ancient era
The Loutrochori area has been a spa from the 4th century BC under the Macedonian Kingdom.

Modern era
Modern Loutrochori is a relatively new village; it was founded in the 1920s by the first Greek refugees from Pontus, under the name "Μπάνια" (Bania). After the Greek Genocide and the Greco-Turkish War (1919-1922), a large number of Pontic Greek refugees arrived at the village as a result of the population exchange under the Treaty of Lausanne. In 1926, the village's name was changed to "Λουτροχώρι" (Loutrochori).

Demographics

The village's population grew rapidly after 1923. After the Second World War and the Greek Civil War, the population steadily declined as residents moved to larger towns and cities or emigrated.

The inhabitants are (100%) ethnic Greeks and  Greek Orthodox Christians.

Geography

Loutrochori is the southwestern part of the municipality of Skydra.

Locations and distance

Nearest places

Big cities

Climate

The average temperature is 14.8 degrees Celsius and the average rainfall about 470 millimetres per year.

Loutrochori has a Mediterranean climate with mild, rainy winters and hot, dry summers. 
The coolest month is January, averaging .

Economy
Loutrochori produces cherries, apples, some strawberries and peaches.

Gallery

Churches and Chapels in Loutrochori

References

External links
 Loutrochori on GTP Travel Pages (Community)
 Loutrochórion (Pélla, Macedonia, Greece)
 Map of Central Macedonia. - Loutrochori NW (20)
 A blog about Loutrochori
 Primary school of Loutrochori
 Kindergarten of Loutrochori
 Loutrochori (epigraphy, Delacoulonche 242,24)

 
Populated places in Pella (regional unit)
Spa towns in Greece